The Georgia women's national under-16 basketball team is a national basketball team of Georgia, administered by the Georgian Basketball Federation. It represents the country in women's international under-16 basketball competitions.

FIBA U16 Women's European Championship participations

See also
Georgia women's national basketball team
Georgia women's national under-18 basketball team
Georgia men's national under-16 basketball team

References

External links
Archived records of Georgia team participations

Basketball in Georgia (country)
Basketball
Women's national under-16 basketball teams